Scott Thomas is an American director, screenwriter, producer and creator of Pacific Entertainment Group Inc.

Filmography

Director
 Flight of the Living Dead: Outbreak on a Plane (2007)
 Yesterday's Dreams (2005)
 Latin Dragon (2004)
 Anacardium AKA Deranged (2001)
 One West Waikiki (1996) (TV series) (episode "Rest in Peace")
 Silent Assassins (1988) (co-director)
 A Place to Hide (1988)

Writer
 Flight of the Living Dead: Outbreak on a Plane (2007)
 Latin Dragon (2004)
 Anacardium AKA Deranged (2001)
 NightMan (1997) (TV series)

Producer
 Flight of the Living Dead: Outbreak on a Plane (2007) (producer)
 Latin Dragon (2004) (producer)
 Blue Hill Avenue (2001) (supervising producer)
 NightMan (1997) (TV movie) (producer)
 NightMan (1997) (TV series) (producer for 3 episodes)
 Gargoyles: The Goliath Chronicles (1996) (TV series) (supervising producer for 1 episode)
 Ultraforce (1995) (TV series) (executive producer for 13 episodes)
 One West Waikiki (1994–1996) (TV series) (producer for 18 episodes)
 The Color of Evening (1994) (co-producer)
 X-Men (1992–1996) (TV series) (supervising producer for 63 episodes)
 P.S. I Luv U (1991) (TV series) (supervising producer for 1 episode)
 Jesse Hawkes (1989) (TV series) (supervising producer)
 Charley Hannah (1986) (TV movie) (supervising producer)
 Two Fathers' Justice (1985) (TV movie) (supervising producer)
 Hard Knox (1984) (TV movie) (supervising producer)

References

External links

Living people
American film directors
American film producers
American male screenwriters
Place of birth missing (living people)
Year of birth missing (living people)
American television directors
American television producers